Mystacella is a genus of flies in the family Tachinidae.

Species
These nine species belong to the genus Mystacella:
 Mystacella adjuncta (Wulp, 1890) c g
 Mystacella aurea (Townsend, 1916) c g
 Mystacella chrysoprocta (Wiedemann, 1830) i c g b
 Mystacella commetans (Walker, 1861) c g
 Mystacella flavifrons Wulp, 1890 c g
 Mystacella frioensis (Reinhard, 1922) i c g
 Mystacella frontalis (Townsend, 1915) i c g
 Mystacella rufata (Bigot, 1889) c g
 Mystacella solita Wulp, 1890 c g
Data sources: i = ITIS, c = Catalogue of Life, g = GBIF, b = Bugguide.net

References

Exoristinae
Diptera of North America
Tachinidae genera